Stan the Man is a nickname that predominantly refers to Stan Musial (1920–2013), an American baseball player.

It is also a nickname of:

 Stan Lee (1922–2018), president and chairman of Marvel Comics
 Stan Longinidis (born 1965), Australian kickboxer
 Stan "The Man" Rofe (1933–2003), Australian radio disc jockey
 Stan Stasiak (1937–1997), American former professional wrestler
 Stan Collymore (born 1971), English footballer
 Stan Wawrinka (born 1985), Swiss tennis player
 Konstantin Stanislavski (1863–1938), Russian former actor and director
 Stiliyan Petrov (born 1979), Bulgarian footballer

See also
 Don Stanhouse (born 1951), aka "Stan the Man Unusual", American baseball player
 Stan "The Man" Turrentine, the debut album by jazz saxophonist Stanley Turrentine

Lists of people by nickname